Commodore OS (full name: Commodore OS Vision) was a free-to-download Linux distribution developed by Commodore USA and intended for Commodore PCs. The distribution was based on Linux Mint, available only for x86-64 architectures, and used the GNOME 2 desktop environment. A community version for x86 was in development up through 2019.[4] The first public beta version was released on 11 November 2011. It has been continually updated through Commodore OS Vision 0.8 Beta and never came out of beta phase. 1.0 did come out of Beta and was released on DistroWatch.com.

This operating system is no longer in development. The company is now closed, and its web site is no longer active. Commodore USA's spiritual successor, My Retro Computer, has it available to download for archival purposes.[5] Leo Nigro, former CTO of Commodore USA, who was responsible for the OS has announced he will make a new release in time for the return of the Commodore 64x.[6]

History

The first beta release of the OS was released on 12 November 2011, announced as an operating system for "pre-installation on all future Commodore USA hardware". Commodore USA went defunct in 2013, the website hosting the OS is down and its last release was on 9 July 2012. However, it continues to have a small community support - with an unofficial 32 bit version of the operating system released on 22 February 2012. The software and drivers have continued to be available through a page set up by ex-Commodore USA employees who run the still active Commodore USA Facebook page.[7]

Compatibility
Commodore OS was not compatible with Commodore 64 software. However, it did contain VICE, an open-source program which emulates Commodore systems.

Design
Commodore OS was designed as a way to imitate the look and feel of Commodore's legacy systems, and as a complement to the all-in-one-keyboard style of the personal computer. Commodore OS includes a  collection of software intended to imitate classic Commodore software.

It was fully compatible only to Commodore USA products often causing kernel panic on general PCs. An Improved Fusion version was promised but never released.

References

4. "cbmosvision". Retrieved 15 July 2022.
5. "C-USA - My Retro Computer". Retrieved 15 July 2022.
6. "Watch our new Commodore OS vision trailer!" 23 May 2022. Retrieved 15 July 2022.
7. "Commodore USA Product Support Page". 4 September 2016. Retrieved 15 July 2022.

External links 
 Commodore OS Website (Defunct)
 Commodore OS archive
 Customize Linux Mint in Commodore OS Vision [Italian]

2011 software
Commodore 64
Debian-based distributions
Ubuntu derivatives
Linux distributions